In Greek mythology, Horme is the Greek spirit personifying energetic activity, impulse or effort (to do a thing), eagerness, setting oneself in motion, and starting an action, and particularly onrush in battle. She had an altar at Athens, where mainly the divine servants and relations of Zeus (including Pheme and Aidos, as well as Athena) had altars. Her opposite character is Aergia, a goddess of sloth and apathy. The word "horme" is also used to refer to the philosophical concept represented by the goddess.

Legacy 
 The name 'horme' was adopted by Sir Percy Nunn to refer to all the purposive behaviours (drives or urges) of an organism – whether conscious or not.  He based this on a suggestion by Jung but saw it as having a wider significance than Jung's idea of relating the term to psychological values. Maria Montessori made this a central point of her later thinking, stressing that the behaviour of the child was driven by an inner urge to self construct, to become the adult they were destined to be. This idea of the future drawing the child on (as opposed to child development being just driven by causality) was related to the Aristotelian concept of entelechy which would have formed an implicit part of her Thomist education as a devout Catholic.   The concept, but not the name, has been developed by writers such as James Hillman where he applies the idea to adults and refers to it as 'destiny' or the individual's daemon.
 In On Obligations, Cicero contrasts horme with reason as one of two aspects of the soul.  He seems to be using where one would expect to see the word "passion" or "emotion″.  In the Walsh translation it is rendered "appetite".
 The Greek writer Arrian of Nicomedia owned a much-loved greyhound called Horme, whose character and name he recorded for posterity in his Kynēgetikos.

Notes

References 
 Pausanias, Description of Greece with an English Translation by W.H.S. Jones, Litt.D., and H.A. Ormerod, M.A., in 4 Volumes. Cambridge, MA, Harvard University Press; London, William Heinemann Ltd. 1918. . Online version at the Perseus Digital Library
 Pausanias, Graeciae Descriptio. 3 vols. Leipzig, Teubner. 1903.  Greek text available at the Perseus Digital Library.
 William Smith, Dictionary of Greek and Roman Biography and Mythology, v. 2, p. 525

Greek goddesses
Personifications in Greek mythology